Ephraim "Eppy" Evron (June 12, 1920 – July 17, 1995) was an Israeli diplomat.

Biography
Ephraim Evron was  born in Haifa during the British Mandate, Evron served in a variety of positions within the Israeli government and as ambassador to several countries, including the United States from 1978 to 1982. When Evron was in charge of Israel's Ministry of Foreign Affairs in 1975 he met his Mexican counterpart, Emilio Rabasa, in Rome to discuss about the UN Resolution 3379 "Zionism is Racism", which was promoted on the context of the World Conference on Women, 1975 in Mexico. As a result, the American Jewish community started a touristic boycott against Mexico. Evron was an important piece in the negotiations to solve this issue between Israel, Mexico and the US Jewish community. Evron was married to Rivka Passman in 1943 and had a son and daughter.  He died in 1995 in Ramat Gan. 
His cause of death was due to a Heart Attack.

Diplomatic career
1949–1951 Political Secretary to Israeli Foreign Minister
1951–1952 Secretary to Prime Minister
1953–1953 Second Secretary at the Israeli Embassy in Washington D.C.
1954–1955 Executive Assistant to Defence Minister
1957–1961 Israeli Federation of Labor
1961–1965 Counsellor and then Minister at the Israeli Embassy in London
1965–1968 Minister at the Israeli Embassy in Washington D.C.
1968–1969 Ambassador to Sweden
1969–1971 Ambassador to Canada
1972–1973 Assistant Director General at the Ministry of Foreign Affairs
1973–1977 Deputy Director General
1977–1978 Director General
1978-1982 Non resident Ambassador to the Bahamas
1979–1982 Ambassador to the United States

References

1920 births
1995 deaths
Ambassadors of Israel to the United States
Ambassadors of Israel to Sweden
Ambassadors of Israel to Canada
Jews in Mandatory Palestine
People from Haifa
Ambassadors of Israel to the Bahamas